E900 may refer to:

 Asus E900, a subnotebook computer
 Fujifilm FinePix E900, a digital camera
 Polydimethylsiloxane or dimethyl polysiloxane (E number: E900), a food additive
 Samsung SGH-E900, a mobile phone

See also

 E90 (disambiguation)